Snap! is a greatest hits album by The Jam, released on 14 October 1983, one year after the group disbanded. The double-album includes all sixteen of the band's UK singles, plus some B-sides, album tracks and rarities. Stephen Thomas Erlewine of AllMusic called it "one of the greatest greatest-hits albums of all time". A shorter version, removing the 8 non-singles, was released as a single CD in 1985 as Compact Snap!.

Editions 
Initial quantities of the album included a limited edition 4 track EP, Live, recorded at Wembley Arena during the farewell tour of 1982. Featuring the tracks "Get Yourself Together", "Move On Up", "The Great Depression" and "But I'm Different Now", the EP is notable for the fact that these songs were never re-issued on any other Jam compilation.

A shorter version, cutting 8 tracks, was released as a single CD in 1984 as Compact Snap!. The omitted tracks were the non-single tracks "Away from the Numbers", "Billy Hunt", "English Rose", "Mr. Clean", "The Butterfly Collector", "Thick As Thieves", "Man in the Corner Shop" and "Tales from the Riverbank". The result is that Compact Snap! is a collection of all The Jam's singles, with the exception of "Just Who Is the 5 O'Clock Hero?". The CD was repackaged in 1990 as All The Choice Cuts for the Australian market as part of the Polydor Startrax series. Compact Snap! has a similar track listing to The Very Best of The Jam with "Smithers-Jones" replacing "Just Who Is the 5 O'Clock Hero?".

Universal Music re-released the album in its entirety on CD in 2006, initial copies including the limited edition live EP.

Track listing

Limited edition live EP
"Move On Up" (Live at Wembley Arena, 2&3 Dec. 1982)
"Get Yourself Together" (Live at Wembley Arena, 2&3 Dec. 1982)
"The Great Depression" (Live at Wembley Arena, 2&3 Dec. 1982)
"But I'm Different Now" (Live at Wembley Arena, 2&3 Dec. 1982)

Charts
Snap! spent 30 weeks on the UK album charts, which debuted and peaked at No. 2 for two weeks.

References 

The Jam albums
1983 compilation albums
Polydor Records compilation albums
Polydor Records live albums